Ronald Michael Glavin (born 27 March 1951) is a Scottish former footballer, who played as a midfielder. Glavin played for Partick Thistle, Celtic, Barnsley, Belenenses, Barnsley, Farsley Celtic, Stockport County, Cowdenbeath and St. Louis Steamers. He represented Scotland once, in 1977. After retiring as a player, Glavin managed clubs in English non-league football. His younger brother Tony was also a footballer.

Club career
Glavin began his League career at Partick Thistle and spent six years at the club, making his name as a talented attacking midfielder before joining Celtic in 1974. During his five years at Parkhead, Glavin enjoyed success including winning the League championship. The 1976–77 season was noted for Glavin's prolific scoring from midfield.

He joined Barnsley on 7 June 1979, then under the management of Allan Clarke. Then in the Third Division, Barnsley rose to promotion under the management of Norman Hunter in 1981 and thereafter became an established Second Division club. Glavin became a favourite with Barnsley supporters with his outstanding skilful play and prolific scoring from midfield. He is widely regarded as one of Barnsley's all-time greats.

He moved to Portuguese club Belenenses in 1984, but returned to Barnsley for a brief spell as a player-coach within a year. In 1986, he moved on to a similar role at Stockport County, but finished the 1986–87 season as a player at Cowdenbeath in Scotland.

International career
Glavin won a Scotland cap during his time at Celtic, playing in a friendly match against Sweden in April 1977.

Management and coaching
He began his management career at Frickley Athletic in 1991, before moving on to Emley in 1994. He led Emley to the third round of the FA Cup in 1997–98, where they played West Ham. He returned to Barnsley as first team coach in the summer of 2003, but left after four months following a takeover. He took over as manager at Worksop Town, replacing Steve Ludlam, but returned to Emley, now renamed Wakefield in September 2007. On 13 October 2010, it was announced that Glavin had stepped down from first team management duties to concentrate on a new role as director of youth development.

Honours 

 Barnsley Hall of Fame

References

External links
Época 1984–85: Primeira Divisão Arquivos de Bola

1951 births
Living people
Footballers from Glasgow
Scottish footballers
Barnsley F.C. players
Partick Thistle F.C. players
Celtic F.C. players
Stockport County F.C. players
Cowdenbeath F.C. players
C.F. Os Belenenses players
Scotland international footballers
Scottish football managers
English Football League players
Association football midfielders
Worksop Town F.C. managers
Scottish Football League players
Frickley Athletic F.C. managers
Scottish expatriate footballers
Expatriate footballers in Portugal
Expatriate soccer players in the United States
St. Louis Steamers (original MISL) players
Wakefield F.C.
Barnsley F.C. non-playing staff
Burnley F.C. non-playing staff